"Cheree" is a song by the synth punk band Suicide, written by its members Martin Rev and Alan Vega. It was released as a single in 1978 by Bronze Records. Since its initial release, it has been covered by a number of artists, most notably by ? and the Mysterians on their 1999 album More Action.

Accolades 

(*) designates unordered lists.

Formats and track listing 
All songs written by Martin Rev and Alan Vega
UK 7" single (BRO 57)
"Cheree" – 3:45
"I Remember" – 3:15

Personnel
Adapted from the Cheree liner notes.
Suicide
 Martin Rev – keyboards
 Alan Vega – vocals
Production and additional personnel
 Craig Leon – production
 Marty Thau – production

Release history

References

External links 
 

1977 songs
1978 singles
1986 singles
Suicide (band) songs
Bronze Records singles
Songs written by Martin Rev
Songs written by Alan Vega